Tomi Pierucci (born September 6, 1983) is an Argentine entrepreneur. He is the founder of several successful businesses including Little Blue, Big Blue Ideas and Bluesmart.

Personal life
Tomás Pierucci, better known as Tomi Pierucci, was born in Buenos Aires, Argentina to a family of entrepreneurs.

He studied Marketing at Universidad de Ciencias Empresariales y Sociales and continued his studies at IAE Business School and IESE Business School. He started his first company while still in high-school during the middle of Argentina's worst economic crisis.

See also
 Bluesmart, Pierucci's latest company

References

1983 births
Living people
Argentine businesspeople
Founders
People from Buenos Aires